Ajay Chakraborty (born 8 December 1943) was a member of the 14th Lok Sabha of India. He represented the Basirhat constituency of West Bengal and is a member of the Communist Party of India (CPI) political party. He had won the Basirhat seat five times in a row. He faced a humiliating defeat in the 2009 Lok Sabha election when he lost the Basirhat seat to Trinamool Congress candidate Sk. Nurul Islam.

External links
 Official biographical sketch in Parliament of India website

1943 births
Living people
Communist Party of India politicians from West Bengal
People from Basirhat
India MPs 2004–2009
India MPs 1996–1997
India MPs 1998–1999
India MPs 1999–2004
Lok Sabha members from West Bengal
People from North 24 Parganas district
West Bengal municipal councillors